Below is a list of newspapers published in Poland. In Poland, the distinction between the broadsheet and tabloid newspapers is mostly format, as most newspapers converted to the latter in the early 1990s.

The daily circulation of national newspapers in February 2010, published by Związek Kontroli Dystrybucji Prasy (The Board of Press Distribution Control):

All-national daily newspapers

 Fakt — 596,726
 Gazeta Wyborcza — 437,013
 Super Express — 312,656
 Rzeczpospolita — 194,123
 Dziennik Gazeta Prawna — 148,867
 Przegląd Sportowy — 92,771
 Puls Biznesu — 21,776
 Parkiet — 15,176

Regional newspapers 
All Polish regions have their own newspapers, mostly limited to the voivodeship where they are issued. In addition, all major national newspapers issue a daily attachment related to local topics.

Regional business newspapers also started in 2004, covering Warsaw (Biznes Warszawski), Gdansk/Gdynia (Biznes Trojmiejski), Poznan (Biznes Poznanski), Wroclaw (Biznes Wroclawski), and Slask (Biznes Slaski).  These biweeklies are modeled on the U.S. business journal model.

Greater Poland 
 Głos Wielkopolski
 Biznes Poznanski

Kuyavia and Southern Pomerania 
 Gazeta Pomorska — 43.65%
 Express Bydgoski — 15.7%
 Nowości: Gazeta Pomorza i Kujaw — 14.5%

Lesser Poland 
 Gazeta Krakowska — 29.2%
 Dziennik Polski — 26.8%

Łódź Voivodeship 
 Dziennik Łódzki (Łódź Daily) and Wiadomości Dnia (Today News) — 28.31%
 Express Ilustrowany (Illustrated Express) — 26.6%
 Łódź Post (Polish News in English)

Lower Silesia 
 Gazeta Wrocławska — 16.5%
 Słowo Polskie — 4.7%
 Biznes Wrocławski

Lublin Voivodeship
 Dziennik Wschodni — 18.6%
 Kurier Lubelski — 13.8%
 Nowiny — 0.2%

Lubusz Voivodeship 
 Gazeta Lubuska — 59.5%

Masovia 
 Metropol — 15.5% (free of charge)
 Metro — 13.0% (free of charge)
 Życie Warszawy — 4.0%
 Echo Dnia — 2.3%
 Biznes Warszawski

Opole Silesia 
 Nowa Trybuna Opolska — 49.8%

Podlaskie 
 Gazeta Współczesna — 36.3%
 Kurier Poranny — 20.3%

Pomerania 
 Dziennik Bałtycki — 48.6%
 Głos Pomorza — 8.0%
 Dzień Dobry — 3.6% (free of charge)
 Gazeta Pomorska — 2.6%

Silesia 
 Dziennik Zachodni — 27.9%
 Trybuna Śląska — 11.0%

Świętokrzyskie Voivodeship 
 Echo Dnia — 33.7%
 Słowo Ludu — 10.4%

Subcarpathia 
 Nowiny — 32.6%
 Super Nowości — 27.4%
 Echo Dnia — 3.2%

Warmia and Masuria 
 Gazeta Olsztyńska — 47.2%
 Gazeta Współczesna — 4.9%

Western Pomerania 
 Kurier Szczeciński — 25.5%
 Głos Szczeciński — 19.5%
 Głos Koszaliński and Słupski — 16.5% combined
 Głos Pomorza — 5.8%

 Polish newspapers in German 
 Schlesisches Wochenblatt Polen-Rundschau International newspapers 
 The Warsaw Voice (in English language, approximately 12,500)
 Krakow Post (in English language, approximately 50,000)
 Łódź Post (in English language, online publication)
 Poland Daily 24 (in English language, online publication)
 The Warsaw Post'' (in English language, online publication)

See also
 List of magazines in Poland

References

Further reading
 

Poland
 
Newspapers